Vernon Lushington KC, (8 March 1832 – 24 January 1912), was a Positivist, Deputy Judge Advocate General, Second Secretary to the Admiralty, and was associated with the Pre-Raphaelites. He was a Cambridge Apostle.

Lushington was born in Westminster, London, to Stephen and Sarah Grace (née Carr) Lushington; his twin brother was Godfrey Lushington, KCB GCMG, Permanent Under-Secretary of State of the Home Office. He was educated at East India College, Haileybury, Hertfordshire, and Trinity College, Cambridge. He became a QC, a county court judge, Secretary to the Admiralty in 1871, and Deputy Judge Advocate General from 1878 to 1912. He married Jane Mowatt, daughter of Francis Mowatt, on 28 February 1865. From 1877 to 1903 the Lushington family's country residence was Pyports, Cobham, Surrey.

With his brother Godfrey, he advocated positivist philosophy, motivated by the ideas of Auguste Comte, and was a follower of Frederic Harrison. Influenced by Frederick Denison Maurice, he joined the Working Men's College as a singing teacher, and promoter of art and music appreciation; he became part of the group that formed the first College governing Corporation in 1854. At the death of Maurice in 1872, he, with his brother, and Frederick James Furnivall, Thomas Hughes, and Richard Buckley Litchfield, became a unifying force at the College.

He was a friend to artists, authors and activists, particularly those of The Pre-Raphaelite Brotherhood and the Arts and Crafts Movement who gravitated to the Working Men's College. In 1856, it was he who first introduced Edward Burne-Jones to Dante Gabriel Rossetti in his college rooms. Rossetti used Lushington’s wife, Jane, as a model in 1865.

Lushington, friend of William Morris, was a frequent visitor to Kelmscott Manor. He was a close friend of Leslie Stephen and his family; Stephen’s daughter Virginia (later Woolf) based her character Mrs. Dalloway on Lushington’s daughter Kitty. He was also a close friend of Working Men’s College founder Richard Buckley Litchfield and his wife Etty, daughter of Charles Darwin; the Lushingtons were regular visitors to Darwin’s Down House. As Thomas Carlyle’s friend, he edited Carlyle’s first Collected Works, (Chapman and Hall, 1858).

Musical family
Jane Lushington was a talented musician who sang in the Bach Choir and played the piano. Her playing was admired by Charles Darwin. She and her three daughters (Kitty, Margaret and Susan) were the subject of a painting by Arthur Hughes. The Home Quartet: Mrs Vernon Lushington and her Children was first exhibited in 1883, and shows Mrs Lushington at the piano, two daughters with violins and a third with a cello.

References

1832 births
1912 deaths
People educated at Haileybury and Imperial Service College
Alumni of Trinity College, Cambridge
19th-century King's Counsel
20th-century King's Counsel
British barristers
20th-century English judges
Permanent Secretaries to the Admiralty
County Court judges (England and Wales)
19th-century English judges